Barry Devon Richardson (born May 15, 1986) is a former American football offensive tackle. He was drafted by the Kansas City Chiefs in the sixth round of the 2008 NFL Draft. He played college football at Clemson.

Professional career

Kansas City Chiefs
Richardson was selected by the Kansas City Chiefs in the sixth round (170th overall) of the 2008 NFL Draft. He signed a three-year contract with the team on June 25, 2008. He played in six games in 2008, with no starts. He was waived during final cuts on September 6, 2009, but was re-signed to the team's practice squad on September 7. He was promoted to the active roster on October 17, and subsequently played in ten games with one start in 2009. He was re-signed to a one-year contract on March 31, 2010. Following a groin injury to Ryan O'Callaghan, Richardson became the starting right tackle for the Chiefs. Richardson was released by the Chiefs following the 2011 NFL season

St. Louis Rams
Richardson signed with the St. Louis Rams on May 15, 2012. He started 16 games at right tackle for the Rams in 2012.

Tennessee Titans
Richardson signed with the Tennessee Titans on June 19, 2013. On August 26, 2013, he was waived by the Titans.

Detroit Lions
On October 22, 2013, Richardson signed with the Detroit Lions. He played one game for the Lions, but was cut on November 5.

References

External links
Kansas City Chiefs bio
Clemson Tigers bio

1986 births
Living people
People from Mount Pleasant, South Carolina
Players of American football from South Carolina
American football offensive tackles
Clemson Tigers football players
Kansas City Chiefs players
St. Louis Rams players
Tennessee Titans players
Detroit Lions players